The Union Académique Internationale (UAI)—in English, International Union of Academies—is a federation of many national academies and international academies from more than 60 countries all over the world which works in the field of Humanities and Social Sciences.

The Union wants to create an international collaboration between its Member Academies, offering to them a chance to meet and work together on projects of medium and long term and enabling them to participating to the great national and international movement of scientific research. Its purpose is to encourage cooperation in the advancement of studies through collaborative research and joint publications in those branches of humanities and social sciences promoted by the Academies and Institutions represented in the UAI: philology, archaeology, history, moral sciences and political sciences. The UAI works to promote the advancement of knowledge and scientific exchanges and to support initiatives of all its academies.

French and English are the official languages of the union.

History

Creation 
The UAI was founded in 1919 on the initiative of the Académie des Inscriptions et Belles-Lettres. After four years of war, the world was longing for peace and understanding between nations. With this in mind, international cooperation was to be promoted in all areas and at all levels, including those of intellectual and scientific work. 
At a meeting held in Paris in May 1919, the draft statutes were prepared. They were revised and adopted at a second meeting held again in Paris from 15 to 18 October 1919. The proposed project envisaged international academic cooperation in the area of the humanities.  During these assemblies, representatives of National Academies from eleven countries adhered to the Union (Belgium, Denmark, France, Great Britain, Greece, Italy, Japan, the Netherlands, Poland and Russia, the United States) and National Academies of three other countries gave their agreement without being represented (Spain, Norway and Romania). Later in that year, Yugoslavia and Portugal adhered to the Union. Currently, the UAI has members from more than 60 countries all over the world.

First Assembly in Brussels 

The first general assembly was held in Brussels from 26 to 28 May 1920 where the Belgian historian Henri Pirenne was elected the first president. The administrative seat of the Union was established in the Palace of Academies in Brussels. The Académie royale des sciences, des lettres et des beaux-arts de Belgique is in charge of the secretariat of the UAI and its Permanent Secretary is ex officio the General Secretary.

During this first session, three projects (in French, entreprises) were submitted: the Corpus vasorum antiquorum, the Alchemical Manuscripts, and publication of the Works of Grotius. These projects of a real international character have since earned the thanks of scholars by the meticulous precision with which they have been executed.  Up to the Second World War one can observe a slow development:  13 projects were adopted.  Currently, the UAI has 81 projects completed or in progress. The UAI can only realize its projects through the international cooperation of its Member Academies.

The following years 

Between 1937 and 1947 no General Assemblies were held because of the world catastrophe and all its consequences. In 1949, the UAI takes pride in having assisted in the foundation of the International Council for Philosophy and Humanistic Studies (ICPHS)in French: Conseil International de la Philosophie et des Sciences Humaines (CIPSH). In 1964, the UAI received the Erasmus Prize for its success in promoting international collaboration. In 1969, the 50th anniversary of the UAI was celebrated:  a ceremony was held under the cupola of the prestigious Institut de France in Paris.  In 1976, the UAI included 31 member countries and the number of its projects had risen to 32.  In 1995, the 75th anniversary of the UAI was celebrated in Prague.

The 100th anniversary was celebrated at the Institut de France in Paris in 2019.

Missions and objectives 

The missions of the Union Académique Internationale are:

1. to encourage cooperation between national Academies (and comparable institutions) whose activities are mainly or partly concerned with the field of human and social sciences. This cooperation is achieved by leading projects of high scholarly and intellectual standard and by coordinating interdisciplinary and joint activities, conceived in full partnership, over the long and medium-term. These should result in the production of fundamental reference tools that enhance the knowledge and advance fundamental research, for the benefit of both the people involved in the research (scholars, experts, researchers,...) and the general public;
2. to preserve and promote of the human and social sciences, at the level of both national and international academies;
3. to develop a solid support for every national academy and its members, provided people are convinced of the rightfulness and the advantages of this solidarity and international cooperation.

To achieve its mission, the UAI will work, in the years to come:

1. to increase inter-academy cooperation by multiplying the projects which it will share or initiate;
2. to encourage all the national organisations that are active in the domain of human and social sciences, to join the uai by developing or cooperating on scholarly projects of a high standard recognised at the international level;
3. toat the international level to represent jointly and in a proactive way, directly or indirectly (in partnership with supranational and or non governmental organisations) both the academies themselves and their fundamental principle of excellence.

To fulfil its mission and to carry out its vision, the UAI will have the following objectives:

1. to strengthen the progress and the implementation of current projects and to increase their relevance in a positive and critical way; to undertake syntheses, made available to the Member Academies;
2. to set up a strategic plan that will consider the dissemination of information to be essential in the new information age, a plan that will facilitate the sharing of knowledge and the spread of information, and that will be updated through periodic assessments;
3. to update the functioning of its governance and management bodies and to develop a positive image by a critical reassessment of its communication tools;
4. to increase its financial means and the funds made available for projects through a systematic search for partnership with international public or private foundations;
5. to encourage member academies to participate more actively in current projects and to set up new interdisciplinary and internationally oriented projects;
6. to strengthen its presence and its participation in international organizations by increasing its visibility in these venues, utilizing its accumulated knowledge and that of its members, and emphasizing its links with the global communications set up by them.

Management

The Board 
The Board (in French, le Bureau) is responsible for organizing the General Assembly and presides over its deliberations; it controls the general administration and the progress of works. It is entitled to take urgent measures in the interval between General Assemblies and, if necessary, to convene an Extraordinary General Assembly. The Board has all the powers of management and administration that are necessary or appropriate to carry out the purposes of the association, except those specifically reserved to the General Assembly.

It is composed of a President, two Vice-Presidents and six members, with Honorary Presidents in a consultative role. All are elected for a term of three years. The Secretary General is also a member of the Board.

General Assembly 
Each year, a representative (called "delegate") from every member academy attends a General Assembly to discuss and to cooperate in meetings.  The General Assembly is always held at the seat of one of the UAI's Member Academies and each year at a different location: one year in Brussels, one year somewhere else in Europe, one year somewhere outside Europe.

General Secretariat 
The Secretary General attends to the coordination of the activities of the UAI, follows the progress of the various projects and supports the Bureau in its handling of the correspondence and agenda of the UAI and in the organization of annual sessions. Since its foundation the UAI has its seat in the Palace of Academies in Brussels. The Académie royale des sciences, des lettres et des beaux-arts de Belgique is in charge of the secretariat of the UAI and its Permanent Secretary is the ex officio General Secretary.

Projects 
Since 1919, the number of projects sponsored, supported or supervised by the UAI has steadily increased:  from the first three projects adopted in 1919, to 81 projects completed or in progress today.

An initiative for a new project can only be taken by a Member Academy of the UAI (through its delegate mandated for this purpose) or by the Board of the UAI itself. The proposal must contain  a precise definition of its subject, an explanatory memorandum, a work plan, a budget and a statement of the financial responsibility for its execution. The project must set and maintain high standards of scholarship, as well as possessing international character and interest.

List of projects

References

External links 
  

International educational organizations
National academies of arts and humanities
International learned societies
International organisations based in Belgium
Educational institutions established in 1919
Members of the International Science Council
1919 establishments in France